was a member of the House of Representatives, the lower house of the National Diet. He is a member of the Liberal Democratic Party. He resigned his position in the National Diet in 2005 after being arrested for groping a woman.

References

Living people
Liberal Democratic Party (Japan) politicians
Year of birth missing (living people)